Federico Mazzotta (1839-1897) was an Italian painter, mainly of genre subjects, but also historic and Neo-Pompeian themes.

He was born in Naples and a resident of Capua. In 1884, at Turin, he exhibited: Un disastro and Un piccolo disastro. In 1886 at Milan, in 1886, he displayed Un trovatello and Il pomo morsicato, and in 1887 at Venice: In campagna.

At the 1866 Neapolitan Promotrice, he displayed Margherita Pusterla and her jailer. Ten years later at the exhibitions of Genova and Milano, he displayed a Dionysius, Tyrant of Syracuse. he painted a La tarantella (1873) in Naples, and Il Sandalo (Neo-Pompeian) (1876) for the Promotrice di Genova.

References

1839 births
1897 deaths
19th-century Italian painters
Italian male painters
Painters from Naples
Neo-Pompeian painters
19th-century Italian male artists